Vadala or Wadala may refer to
Places in India
Wadala, a locality in Mumbai
Wadala (Vidhan Sabha constituency)
Wadala Bridge monorail station
Wadala Depot monorail station
Vadala Road railway station
Wadala Granthian, a village in Punjab
Wadala Kalan, a village in Punjab
Wadala Khurd, a village in Punjab
Mota Vadala, a village in Gujarat

Places in Pakistan
Wadala Cheema, a village in Punjab
Wadala Cheema Halt railway station
Wadala Sandhuan, a town in Punjab

Others
Vadala (surname)
SS Vadala, an Indian steamship
Shootout at Wadala, a 2013 Indian Hindi-language action film